Monika Maid (born in 1957) is a German singer/songwriter signed under A-team records. She has released two singles: 'Words like a dream' and 'Not a usual day'. She has also participated in the tribute album for the famous Irish singer/songwriter, Chris de Burgh, titled "Everywhere Connections".

Career
Monika started learning music from the very beginning of her childhood "The first contact with music, was my mother and the Kindergarten. Singing children songs and listening to brother Grimm's tales... I loved to sing them and had an own song to sing the rain away until the sun came up." says Monika.
Having decided to become governess, visiting the Fachakademie für Sozialpädagogik in Eichstätt for two years, she had there the chance to learn playing classic guitar. She stopped writing songs and started studying social work. After years her single 'Words Like A Dream' and 'Another Night' were selected in Chris de Burgh's tribute CD, 'Everywhere Connection' in 2007. Following this success she started songwriting again and later that year she cooperated with Sam Chegini, working on a music video pack of her songs with the same title 'Words Like A Dream'. Monika presented the pack to Chris de Burgh later in 2008. In 2009, she released her single 'Manhattan's Night' following the success of the first singles.

Discography

 'Everywhere Connections', Words Like A Dream-Another Night tracks
 'Words Like A Dream' music video pack
 Manhattan's Night single

Notes

References
 Monika Maid's official website
 a-team-records music label
 Everywhere Connections official website
 Monika Maid's page on Everywhere Connection tribute album, website
 Words Like A Dream official page
 Monika Maid Last.fm
 Words Like A Dream

1957 births
Living people
German singer-songwriters